Shīnḍanḍ ({{سبزوار) is a town and the center of the Shindand District, Herat Province, Afghanistan. The Shindand Air Base is located about 15 miles northeast of the town.

Shindand is at the northern end of Zirko Valley, which is one of main centers of poppy production in western Afghanistan. The town is located south of Adriskan, where a large police training facility exists. The population includes Pashtuns, Tajiks and others, though Pashtuns make up the majority. The main languages spoken in the area are Pashto and Dari. During the Soviet–Afghan War (1979–1989) the 5th Guards Motor Rifle Division was headquartered in the town.

Etymology 
The name Shindand means "green pond" in Pashto.

History 
Shindand was once a city of considerable size, and still possesses a fortress with sides of about 200 metres. In the 19th century the city was said to have a diverse population composed of Ghilzais, Durranis (Alakozais, Popalzais, Barakzais), Tajiks, Zuris, Timuris, Jews, and Hindus. By the early 20th century this fortress had been abandoned, and the town, at the centre of a group of villages, was fairly prosperous, with a bazaar of about 800 shops. The plains about Shindand were highly cultivated by the Nurzai Duranis, each village protected by its own little mud fort.

Climate 
With an influence from the local steppe climate, Shindand features a cold semi-arid climate (BSk) under the Köppen climate classification. The average temperature in Shindand is 16.5 °C, while the annual precipitation averages 168 mm.

July is the hottest month of the year with an average temperature of 29.4 °C. The coldest month January has an average temperature of 4.1 °C.

Shindand Air Base 
The Shindand Air Base is located about 15 miles to the northeast of the town, which currently occupied by Afghan and NATO's International Security Assistance Force. It is a former Soviet airfield, repaired by U.S. forces. The area is flat and arid, with foothills to the north and west. The Kandahar–Herat Highway, which is part of Afghanistan's Highway 1, passes next to the Shindand Air Base. A free medical clinic supported by the Afghan National Army (ANA) provides free medical care for the population of the town.

Notable people 
 Herat Province
 Amanullah Khan
 Ismail Khan

See also 
 Azizabad airstrike

References

Further reading 
 Louis Dupree, Afghanistan. 1st Edition: 1973; Ludwig W. Adamec, Historical Dictionary of Afghanistan, 3rd ed., 2003.
 S. I. Bruk, Narody Peredney Azii (1960); S.I. Bruk, and V. S. Apenchenko, Atlas Narodov Mira (Moscow: Academy of Science, 1964) A. Gabriel, Religionsgeographie von Persien (Vienna, 1971).

External links 
 Photo of Shindand market vendor Robert Lankenau, 2005-03-26

Populated places in Herat Province